Club Baloncesto Guadalajara was a professional Basketball team based in Guadalajara, Castile-La Mancha, Spain. It was also known as Rayet Guadalajara by sponsorship reasons.

After the 1992–93 season, the team was promoted to Liga ACB, the Spanish top league, but due to financial problems CB Guadalajara renounced promotion

In 2011, the club was dissolved due to huge debts.

Season by season

References

External links
Official website

Defunct basketball teams in Spain
Basketball teams in Castilla–La Mancha
Former LEB Plata teams
Basketball teams established in 1972
Basketball teams disestablished in 2011
Sport in Guadalajara, Spain